Hampton station or Hampton Road station is a DART Light Rail station Dallas, Texas. It is located in the Oak Cliff neighborhood at Hampton Road and Wright Street.

References

External links
 Dallas Area Rapid Transit - Hampton Station

Dallas Area Rapid Transit light rail stations in Dallas
Railway stations in the United States opened in 1996
1996 establishments in Texas
Railway stations in Dallas County, Texas